The governor-general of Tuvalu is the vice-regal representative of the Tuvaluan monarch, currently King Charles III, in the country of Tuvalu.

The monarch is the head of state of Tuvalu, with the governor-general performing the monarch's duties in Tuvalu. The constitutional convention is that the governor-general represents the monarch and acts on the advice of the prime minister.

The office of the governor-general was created on 1 October 1978, when Tuvalu gained independence from the United Kingdom as a sovereign state and an independent constitutional monarchy. Since then, 10 individuals have served as governor-general. The incumbent, since 28 September 2021, is Sir Tofiga Vaevalu Falani.

Constitutional status and appointment

The monarchy of Tuvalu exists in a framework of a parliamentary representative democracy. As a constitutional monarch, the King acts entirely on the advice of his government ministers in Tuvalu. The monarch is recognised in section 50 of the Constitution of Tuvalu, as a symbol of the unity and identity of Tuvalu. The powers of the head of state are set out in section 52 (1) of the Constitution.

As set out in section 54 of the Constitution, the King's representative in Tuvalu is the governor-general. Section 58 of the Constitution requires the governor-general to perform the monarch's functions when the sovereign is outside Tuvalu or otherwise incapacitated. The governor-general is appointed by the monarch upon the advice of the Tuvaluan prime minister.

Functions

The governor-general has constitutional responsibilities and reserve powers in relation to the ordering the Parliament of Tuvalu to convene and the appointment and dismissal of the prime minister.

Exercise of reserve powers

In 2003, the Chief Justice of the High Court of Tuvalu delivered directions as to how the governor-general should proceed to take any action they considers to be appropriate under Section 116(1) of the Constitution, acting in his own deliberate judgment, rather than as advised by the cabinet. That is, the governor-general could consider whether it was appropriate to exercise their reserve powers in calling Parliament.

The then Governor-General, Sir Iakoba Italeli was called on to exercise the reserve powers when Prime Minister Willy Telavi refused to recall parliament after the 2013 Nukufetau by-election. A constitutional crisis developed when Prime Minister Telavi responded that, under the Constitution, he was only required to convene parliament once a year, and was thus under no obligation to summon it until December 2013. Tuvalu's opposition then requested the governor-general to intervene against the prime minister's decision. On 3 July, Italeli exercised his reserve powers in ordering parliament to convene, against the prime minister's wishes, on 30 July.

When the Parliament met on 30 July, the Speaker (Sir Kamuta Latasi) refused to allow a debate on a motion of no confidence in the government of Willy Telavi. After further political maneuvers, Italeli then proceeded to exercise his reserve powers to order Telavi to stand down as prime minister and appointed Enele Sopoaga as interim prime minister. The governor-general also ordered that parliament sit on Friday 2 August to allow a vote of no-confidence in Telavi and his government. Telavi then proceeded to write to Elizabeth II, Queen of Tuvalu, informing her that he was dismissing Italeli from his position as governor-general. The Queen made no reaction at all, thus leaving Sir Iakoba secure in his post.

The constitutional crisis was resolved by a motion of no confidence in the government of Willy Tevali, which was held on 2 August 2013: the voting was eight for the motion, four against and one abstention. On 4 August the parliament elected Enele Sopoaga as prime minister.

Symbols and privileges

The governor-general uses a personal flag, which features a lion passant atop a St. Edward's royal crown with "Tuvalu" written across a scroll underneath, all on a blue background. It is flown on buildings and other locations in Tuvalu to mark the governor-general's presence.

All governors-general have been awarded the Order of St Michael and St George. Faimalaga Luka had thus far been the only governor-general to decline a knighthood.

Residence

Government House in Funafuti is the official residence of the governor-general of Tuvalu.

List of governors-general

Following is a list of people who have served as Governor-General of Tuvalu since independence in 1978.

A total of ten people have held the position on a permanent basis, while an additional three people have held it on an interim basis due to a vacancy. Teniku Talesi was the first woman to be appointed to the role (albeit for an interim period), holding office from the resignation of Iakoba Italeli in August 2019, until being replaced by Samuelu Teo (then also serving as Speaker of Parliament) in January 2021.

See also

Prime Minister of Tuvalu
Governor of the Gilbert and Ellice Islands
Monarchy of Tuvalu

References

1978 establishments in Tuvalu
Government of Tuvalu
 
Lists of governors-general
Governors-General